Zweigles, Inc., is a food manufacturer of hot dogs, sausages, and deli products. The company is based in Rochester, New York, and was founded in 1880 by C. Wilhelm Zweigle, a German immigrant to the United States. It is most well known for its brand of white hots, which are descended from German white sausages. The company expanded across New York in the 20th and 21st centuries because of partnerships with Wegmans supermarkets and several sports teams, beginning with the Rochester Red Wings in the 1930s.

References

Red or White?, Washington Post, May 24, 2006

External links
Official website

American companies established in 1880
Manufacturing companies based in Rochester, New York
1880 establishments in New York (state)
Food and drink companies established in 1880
Manufacturing companies established in 1880